The Ministry of Trade was the department of the Government of Spain responsible for the proposal and execution of the government policy on trade, supply and currency. The department was initially constituted as a split from the Ministry of Industry and Trade in July 1951, and was enlarged in July 1977 by assuming all competences on tourism from the disestablished Ministry of Information and Tourism. It lasted until October 1980, when it was merged into the Ministry of Economy and Trade.

The department was reformed in July 1993 under Felipe González, lasting until May 1996 when its competences were transferred to the Ministry of Economy and Finance.

References

Defunct departments of the Spanish Government
Ministries established in 1951
Ministries established in 1993
Ministries disestablished in 1980
Ministries disestablished in 1996
1951 establishments in Spain
1993 establishments in Spain
1980 disestablishments in Spain
1996 disestablishments in Spain